William Fort or locally known as Chettuva Fort is located in Chettuva, Thrissur District of Kerala, India.

History
The fort was constructed by the Dutch East India Company with the permission from Kingdom of Cochin in 1714. Fort was later occupied by Zamorin of Calicut and thereafter Tipu Sultan. Tipu Sultan defeated Zamorin of Calicut and renamed it as Tipu Sultan Fort. The fort was captured and recaptured many times by British Empire, Dutch East India Company, Kingdom of Mysore, Zamorin of Calicut and Kingdom of Cochin. Lastly, the fort was captured by Tipu Sultan and demolishes it partially. The fort is now dilapidated and conservation drive was started in 2010 by the State Archeological Department.

References

Forts in Kerala
Mysorean invasion of Malabar
Tourist attractions in Thrissur district
History of Thrissur district
Archaeological sites in Kerala
Buildings and structures completed in 1714
Buildings and structures in Thrissur district
1714 establishments in the Dutch Empire